The Valentine Formation is a geologic unit formation or member within the Ogallala unit in northcentral Nebraska near the South Dakota border. It preserves fossils dating to the Neogene period and is particularly noted for Canid fossils. A particular feature of the Valentine is lenticular beds of green-gray opaline sandstone that can be identified in other states, including South Dakota, Nebraska, Kansas, and Colorado. Even though three mammalian fauna stages can be mapped throughout the range of the Ogallala, no beddings of the Ogallala are mappable and all attempts of formally applying the Valentine to any mappable lithology beyond the type location have been abandoned. Even so, opaline sandstone has been used to refer to the green-gray opalized conglomerate sandstone that is a particular feature of the lower Ogallala.

Development, the earliest Ogallala deposits  
At the beginning of the Ogallala times, as sediments began washing out from the rising Rocky Mountains into the central plains states, the members of the Pierre Shale and Niobrara Formation outcrop had been largely exposed in their present outcrop range. The Niobrara had been broadly incised by the present river systems, but only to a fraction of their present depths. Therefore, the earliest Ogallala deposits, the time of the Valentine deposits, filled in these shallower valleys; but there was no continuous exposure over the range of the eastern outcrop of the Ogallala. Isolated exposures of the Valentine phase have been located along the Niobrara outcrop and quarried along the Smoky Hill River, Solomon River, Republican River, and Niobrara River where these watersheds have cut deeply down through the Niobrara Chalk into the Carlile Shale.

Lithology 
The Valentine Formation presents gray to gray-green, unconsolidated, fine-to-coarse grained, fluvial siltstone, channel sandstone, and gravel eroded from uplift of the Rocky Mountains as well as locally eroded materials, 
particularly Niobrara chalk cobbles and chalk sand. The specific index stone for the Valentine is the lenticular beds of grey-green opaline sandstone.

Distribution 
Even as discussed above, the term Valentine is not now formally used outside of Northcentral Nebraska, older literature in other states with Ogallala may refer to the name.

The opaline sandstone of the lower Ogallala is recognized in Kansas in outcrops on hills to the east of the limits of the upper Ogallala (e.g., Rush, Graham, and Rooks counties). These outcrops, which formed in the bottoms of shallow valleys, are now found on the upper slopes of deeper valleys; that is, in inverted topographies.

The Ogallala's opaline sandstone is to be found in Arkansas River gravel at Pueblo, Colorado.

Uses 
The silicate cementation makes the opaline sandstone denser and harder than any other local stone, and it has been quarried as ballast, road gravel, and dam outflow rip-rap (e.g., Cedar Bluff Reservoir, Sherman Dam). The opaline sandstone has had limited use in construction, and example being the structures in the city park of Hill City, Kansas.  Beds of flint or chert can be found higher in the Valentine and the weathered Niobrara Chalk is also silicified where there is contact with these beds in the Valentine.

Fossil content

Mammals

Bats

Carnivorans

Lagomorphs

Proboscideans

Rodents

Ungulates

Reptiles

Birds

Squamates

Testudines

Amphibians

Fish

Plants

Gallery

See also

 List of fossiliferous stratigraphic units in South Dakota
 Paleontology in South Dakota
 List of fossiliferous stratigraphic units in Nebraska
 Paleontology in Nebraska
 List of fossiliferous stratigraphic units in Kansas
 Paleontology in Kansas

References

Neogene geology of South Dakota
Neogene geology of Nebraska
Neogene geology of Kansas